The Karting World Championship is a kart racing competition organised by the CIK-FIA. It is held annually since 1964, and is karting's flagship event. The FIA (International Automobile Federation) created the CIK (International Karting Commission) in 1962. The Current President of the Championship is former Formula 1 driver Felipe Massa.

The first two World Championships in 1964 and 1965 were held over one final round, there after the world's best kart drivers competed for the title over an extended weekend, from Thursday to Saturday, including free and qualifying practice sessions, qualification heats, a pre-final and a final were common. From 2011 the championship has been disputed over five rounds, each of them in a different country. From 2014 the world championships returned to a single event with one venue each year organizing the CIK-FIA OK and OK Junior World Championships in one weekend and another venue in a different weekend holding the CIK-FIA KZ World Championships together with the CIK-FIA KZ2 Super Cup and the third and final round of the CIK-FIA Karting Academy Trophy. There is a separate CIK-FIA Endurance Championship, normally held each year at Le Mans, France, and there are separate Continental Championships like the CIK-FIA European Championships (OK, OK junior, KZ, KZ2 and Superkart) and the CIK-FIA Asia Pacific Championships. In 1968 CIK-FIA launched the first World Cup for Juniors.

World Championship Karting Categories 

From 1981 to 1989 the World Championship was raced with 135 cc Formula K karts. Before and after that period 100 cc direct-drive karts was the prevailing standard. In 2007, a change in regulations introduced the KF1 category carts, 125 cc karts equipped with electric starters, clutch and rpm limiters set at  rpm, to replace the Formula A karts. The 2010 edition was raced with KF2 karts where the engine rpm is limited at  rpm.

The FIA Karting categories at the world championships are now divided into three main families: direct-drive karts, gearbox karts and Superkarts. All these karts have the technology in common of the 2-stroke engine. Since 2016 the new generation of Original Karts (OK) machines have taken over from the old KF engines. The top category OK at the World Championships is available for drivers from 14 years old in the year they participate. The OK Junior category is aimed at drivers aged between 12 and 14 years old. The gearbox categories KZ and KZ2 share the same specification except for chassis and brakes which are open in the KZ World Championship. The Superkart category is the most unusual discipline of Karting because it can only express itself fully on long racing tracks.

Karting Promotion 

In 2013 for the first time in its history CIK-FIA called a promoter, WSK Promotion, to perfect the organisation of the major international karting competitions.
The Swiss RGMMC Group is now the Official Promoter of the FIA Karting European and World Championships for the period of 2018-2020 (with the exception of Superkart and Endurance). They try increasing the audience for Karting Competitions worldwide, attracting new partners and working closely with ASNs (National Federations), these are the priorities of RGMMC Group. They also develop the communication and media coverage of the events by providing live video viewing during the events and by partnering with Motorsport.tv for broadcast around the world.

From 2022 all the events of the FIA Karting World Championship were sponsored by the website Mondokart.com and the official name of the competition become MONDOKART.COM FIA KARTING WORLD CHAMPIONSHIP

FIA Karting World Champions (Direct Drive & Primary Category)

125 Gearbox FIA Karting World Champions and World Cup Winners 
 

(*) indicates the years the World Championships were held as a World Cup

Note: World Championship status from 1983 to 2000, and from 2012 onwards.
World Cup status from 2003 onwards till 2012

Junior World Champions & Junior World Cup winners 

(*) indicates the years the event status was as a World Cup and not FIA World Championship

(**) Note: From 1992 - 1996 the Junior World Championships were held as the CIK-FIA Five Continents Cup Junior A

Secondary Classes World Champions

CIK-FIA Karting International Supercup

Formula A World Champions

Formula E SuperKart World Champions

References

External links
 FIA Karting
 CIK Champion Davide Fore' Video Archives 
 1990 – 2009 CIK Results

 
World auto racing series
Recurring sporting events established in 1964